Nick Kennedy (born 19 August 1982) is a retired English rugby union player and former Director of Rugby at London Irish. He played Lock for England, London Irish, Toulon and Harlequins.

His uncle Duncan Kennedy is a BBC news correspondent.

Kennedy represented England Saxons at the 2006 Churchill Cup and 2007 Churchill Cup.

He was called into the England Saxons side that defeated Ireland A on 1 February 2008.

Kennedy was selected for the 2008 summer tour of New Zealand. He was later picked for Martin Johnson's Elite Player Squad on 1 June 2008 ahead of Ben Kay. He started his first game against the Pacific Islanders in which he scored a try.

Kennedy participated in every game of the 2009 Six Nations.

In 2012 Kennedy was signed for Toulon for the upcoming 2012/13 season  In May 2013 he started as Toulon won the 2013 Heineken Cup Final by 16–15 against Clermont Auvergne. Following his request to be released from Toulon, he returned to England to sign for Harlequins for 2013/14 season.

After just one season at Harlequins, Kennedy announced his retirement from playing in May 2014 in order to pursue a coaching career after he was appointed academy director at former club London Irish. On 1 July 2016 he was announced as the new Director of Rugby in a new coaching setup following the departure of Tom Coventry. He left his role on 22 March, 2018 shortly after the appointment of Declan Kidney as technical consultant and Les Kiss as head coach.

References

External links
London Irish profile
England profile
Rising up
London Irish confirm Nick Kennedy exit for Toulon

1981 births
Living people
England international rugby union players
English rugby union coaches
English rugby union players
Harlequin F.C. players
London Irish players
Rugby union locks
English people of Irish descent
Alumni of the University of Portsmouth
People educated at Claires Court School
RC Toulonnais players
Rugby union players from Southampton